Bab or BAB can refer to:

Bab (toponymy), a component of Arabic toponyms literally meaning "gate"
 Set (mythology) (also known as Bab, Baba, or Seth) ancient Egyptian God
 Bab (Shia Islam), a term designating deputies of the Imams in Shia Islam
 Báb (Sayyid `Alí Muḥammad Shírází, 1819–1850), founder of Bábism and a central figure in the Bahá'í Faith
 Bab-ı Âli, the gate to the palace of the Grand vizier of the Ottoman Empire
 Báb, Nitra District, a village and municipality in the Nitra District in western central Slovakia
 Bab Ballads, cartoons published by W. S. Gilbert under the childhood nickname, Bab
 Back-arc basin, a geologic feature: a submarine basin associated with island arcs and subduction zones
 "Base Attack Bonus", a term used in d20 System RPG games
 Beale Air Force Base (IATA airport code: BAB), in California
 Biotechnology and Applied Biochemistry, an academic journal
 Boris Berezovsky (businessman) (1946–2013), Boris Abramovich Berezovsky, a powerful Russian oligarch in self-imposed exile in London from 2001
 Build America Bonds, a type of municipal bond created by the American Recovery and Reinvestment Act of 2009
 Bunty Aur Babli, a 2005 Indian film
 German autobahns or Bundesautobahn, federal motorways in Germany
 B. A. Baracus, character on 1980s action series The A-Team
 The British Aikido Board, a federation of independent Aikido associations within the United Kingdom
Babcock International (stock symbol BAB)
Balcombe railway station, a railway station in Sussex, England

See also
 Babs (disambiguation) (includes BABS)
 Babb
 Babs (disambiguation)
 Babe (disambiguation)
 Baby (disambiguation)
 Babel (disambiguation)